Predrag Mitić (born 30 August 1969) is a Serbian former footballer who played as a striker.

Career
Mitić played for OFK Beograd in Yugoslavia, before moving abroad to Greece. He spent a decade playing for EAR Rethymno, OFI Crete, Athinaikos and Agios Nikolaos.

References

External links
 

1969 births
Living people
Yugoslav footballers
Serbia and Montenegro footballers
Serbian footballers
Association football forwards
OFK Beograd players
OFI Crete F.C. players
Athinaikos F.C. players
Yugoslav Second League players
Super League Greece players
Serbia and Montenegro expatriate footballers
Expatriate footballers in Greece
Serbia and Montenegro expatriate sportspeople in Greece